Fromia schultzei, commonly known as the granular starfish, is a species of starfish belonging to the family Goniasteridae. It is found on the coasts of South Africa.

Description
This large starfish normally has five arms. The arms are broad at the base tapering gradually to a rounded, upturned tip. The surface is covered with little bumps, giving the starfish a granular appearance. The colour is dark orange, red or purplish. There are few spines in the adambulacral areas, and those there are regularly arranged, helping to distinguish this species from Nardoa tuberculata, which is also found in South African waters.

References 

schultzei
Animals described in 1910